I Am You Are is the début album by the Italian psychedelic rock band Jennifer Gentle, released in 2001.

Track list
Sound Check
Sweet Girl, I Love You!
Rubber and South
Rudy's Key Balls
No Mind in My Mind
Bring Them
Always Been Together
The Strumpfhose Melodie
Caterpillar Song
Husbands
The Pilots
Singe I've Seen the Seas

References

2001 albums
Jennifer Gentle albums